Melody in Spring is a 1934 American pre-Code musical film directed by Norman Z. McLeod and written by Benn W. Levy, Frank Leon Smith, and Jane Storm. The film stars Lanny Ross, Charlie Ruggles, Mary Boland, Ann Sothern, George Meeker, and Herman Bing. The film was released on April 20, 1934, by Paramount Pictures.

Plot

Cast 
Lanny Ross as John Craddock
Charlie Ruggles as Warren Blodgett 
Mary Boland as Mary Blodgett
Ann Sothern as Jane Blodgett
George Meeker as Wesley Prebble
Herman Bing as Wirt
Wade Boteler as Anton
Thomas E. Jackson as House Detective
William Irving as Mr. Shorter

References
The film was a box office disappointment for Paramount.

References

External links
 

1934 films
American musical films
1934 musical films
Paramount Pictures films
Films directed by Norman Z. McLeod
American black-and-white films
1930s English-language films
1930s American films